Pershing LLC is an American clearing house. Formed in 1939, Pershing became a subsidiary of The Bank of New York Mellon in 2003.  Pershing has nearly $1.9 trillion in assets under administration. The Bank of New York Mellon has more than $35.5 trillion in assets in custody.

History 
The firm was founded on January 1, 1939, as Pershing & Company with $200,000 in capital. The firm's original senior partners were Van Burger, Sr., Ed Cohan, Lou Froehlich, Dave Foster, and its namesake — Warren "Jack" Pershing, the only son of celebrated World War I General of the Armies, John J. Pershing.

In 2000, Credit Suisse First Boston, the capital markets division of Credit Suisse, assumed control of Pershing when it purchased Donaldson, Lufkin & Jenrette and its subsidiaries.

In 2003, BNY Mellon acquired Pershing, the United States' second-largest trade clearinghouse at the time, from CSFB.

Pershing LLC has 23 locations ranging from America to Europe, Middle East, Africa and Asia Pacific.

References

External links
Pershing
Albridge – an affiliate of Pershing

Brokerage firms
Financial services companies established in 1939
Financial services companies based in New Jersey
1939 establishments in New Jersey